Pablo Timoteo De Miranda (Comodoro Rivadavia, Argentina, born February 24, 1986) is an Argentinian  football defender currently playing for Celaya F.C. in the Ascenso MX.

Career
De Miranda started his career with C.A.I. He then went on to play for Colón de Santa Fe in the Argentine Primera División. In 2010, De Miranda signed for Tigre.

References

External links
 
 

1986 births
Living people
People from Comodoro Rivadavia
Argentine people of Spanish descent
Argentine footballers
Argentine expatriate footballers
Association football defenders
Comisión de Actividades Infantiles footballers
Club Atlético Colón footballers
Club Atlético Tigre footballers
Independiente Rivadavia footballers
Ferro Carril Oeste footballers
Instituto footballers
Defensa y Justicia footballers
Alebrijes de Oaxaca players
Club Blooming players
Carlos A. Mannucci players
Argentine Primera División players
Primera Nacional players
Ascenso MX players
Bolivian Primera División players
Peruvian Primera División players
Expatriate footballers in Bolivia
Expatriate footballers in Mexico
Expatriate footballers in Peru
Argentine expatriate sportspeople in Bolivia
Argentine expatriate sportspeople in Mexico
Argentine expatriate sportspeople in Peru